"Love U More" is a song by British techno group Sunscreem, released as a single in July 1992. It was written by band members Paul Carnell and lead singer Lucia Holm. The single is a track off the group's 1993 album O3 and was one of the first techno songs to make the American top 40, where it peaked at No. 36. "Love U More" reached No. 23 in the United Kingdom in July 1992 and went to number one on the American dance chart for two weeks in March 1993, making it their first of three number-one hits there.

Critical reception
Steven McDonald of AllMusic named the song one of the "highlights" of the O3 album. Larry Flick from Billboard wrote, "Quintet has been on the lips of club folks in-the-know for nearly a year now via a pair of invigorating import singles. This cut has already stormed to the top of dance charts worldwide, and is poised for similar success here." He also complimented "the considerable (and unusual) vocal charm" of lead singer Lucia Holm. Dave Sholin from the Gavin Report noted that here, "High energy meets an appealing array of musical styles with the result being a totally fresh production coming off a #1 run in the U.K." A reviewer from Music & Media wrote, "Early '80s electro pop a la Human League comes alive in a new dance jacket. Sequencers follow the rhythms of today's demands, while the melody lingers on." 

New Musical Express commented, "Bicycling down the summer lanes of pristine rave pop, Sunscreem have come up with a mini-gem here. It's too nice to be true. It's full of fabric conditioner and whiter than white sentiments. And surprisingly, perhaps, for an Essex-born dance crossover whose first allegiance was to the pounding beat, it's a fine choon. The combination of singer Lucia Holm's wholesome tones and just the right amount of cybertronic impetus make for a sparkling interface of benign thrust." Charles Aaron of Spin said, "Rather than sampling Kate Bush, this rave "band" hooks up a vocalist who soars to similarly withering heights, but with more grit than ditz. Shades of Rozalla minus the weight of the world."

Charts

Cover versions
In 1995, DJ Paul Elstak released his version of "Luv U More" which reached number 2 on the Dutch Single Top 100. In 1999, German singer Rollergirl's version reached the top 20 in Germany, the Netherlands and Norway, number 51 in Sweden and number 75 in Switzerland. The song was also covered by Steps on their debut album Step One. Some of the more sexually explicit lyrics of the original were removed from the Steps version.

See also
 List of number-one dance singles of 1993 (U.S.)

References

1992 songs
1992 singles
Sunscreem songs
1999 singles
Rollergirl songs
S2 Records singles
Columbia Records singles
Music Week number-one dance singles
Songs written by Lucia Holm
Songs written by Paul Carnell
Steps (group) songs